Nadiya Bychkova (born 24 August 1989) is a Ukrainian ballroom and Latin American dancer who is a multiple-time Slovenian Ballroom and Latin Champion and two-time World and European Champion in ‘10’ Dance. In 2017, she joined the British television show Strictly Come Dancing as a professional dancer. She holds two Guinness World Records at Strictly's Pro Challenge for the most dance steps in 30 seconds - for fleckerls in 2020 and pat-a-cakes in 2021.

Strictly Come Dancing
In 2017, Bychkova appeared as a professional dancer in the fifteenth series of the British television dance show Strictly Come Dancing, partnered with EastEnders actor Davood Ghadami. They reached the quarter final of the competition, finishing in sixth place.

She returned for her second series in 2018, partnered with another 'former' EastEnders actor and Blue singer Lee Ryan. The couple were eliminated in week three. 

Bychkova returned for her third series in 2019 and was partnered with ex-professional footballer David James. They were the fourth couple to be eliminated.

In 2021, Bychkova was paired with BBC television journalist, Breakfast, The NFL Show and former Football Focus presenter Dan Walker, some ten inches taller. 

She had previously been a professional dancer on the Bosnian version of the show.

Highest and Lowest scoring per dance
{| class="wikitable sortable collapsed"
|-style="text-align:Centre; background:#cc;"
!Dance
!Partner
!Highest
!Partner
!Lowest
|-style="text-align:Centre; background:#faf6f6;"
| American Smooth
| Davood Ghadami 
| 35
| David James
| 16
|-style="text-align:Centre; background:#faf6f6;"
| Argentine Tango
| Davood Ghadami 
| 29
|
|
|-style="text-align:Centre; background:#faf6f6;"
| Cha-Cha-Cha
| Davood Ghadami 
| 27
| Lee Ryan
| 19
|-style="text-align:Centre; background:#faf6f6"
| Charleston
| Davood Ghadami 
| 38
| Dan Walker 
| 31
|-style="text-align:Centre; background:#faf6f6"
| Couple’s Choice
|  Dan Walker 
| 28
|
|
|-style="text-align:Centre; background:#faf6f6"
| Foxtrot
| Dan Walker
| 21
| David James
| 17
|-style="text-align:Centre; background:#faf6f6"
| Jive
| Davood Ghadami 
| 29
| David James
| 16
|-style="text-align:Centre; background:#faf6f6"
| Paso Doble
| Davood Ghadami
| 35
| David James
| 10
|-style="text-align:Centre; background #faf6f6"
| Quickstep
| David James 
| 28
| Matt Goss
| 20
|-style="text-align:Centre; background #faf6f6"
| Rumba
| Dan Walker
| 31
| Davood Ghadami
| 25
|-style="text-align:Centre; background #faf6f6"
|Salsa
|
|
|
|
|-style="text-align:Centre; background #faf6f6" 
|Samba
| Davood Ghadami
| 25
| Matt Goss
| 22
|-style="text-align:Centre; background #faf6f6"
|Something-A-Thon
| Davood Ghadami
| 4
|
|
|-style="text-align:Centre; background #faf6f6"
|Showdance| 
|
|
|
|-style="text-align:Centre; background #faf6f6"
|Tango| Dan Walker
| 31
|
|
|-style="text-align:Centre; background #faf6f6"
|Viennese Waltz| Davood Ghadami 
| 29
| Matt Goss
| 21
|-style="text-align:Centre; background #faf6f6"
|Waltz'| Davood Ghadami 
| 35
| Lee Ryan
| 22
|} 
Series 15 (2017): with celebrity partner Davood Ghadami

 numbers indicate Davood & Nadiya were at the top of the leaderboard.
 numbers indicate Davood & Nadiya were at the bottom of the leaderboard.

Series 16 (2018): with celebrity partner Lee Ryan

 numbers indicate Lee & Nadiya were at the bottom of the leaderboard.

Series 17 (2019): with celebrity partner David James

 numbers indicate David & Nadiya were at the bottom of the leaderboard.

Series 19 (2021): with celebrity partner Dan Walker

 numbers indicate Dan & Nadiya were at the bottom of the leaderboard.
 (*) Score awarded by guest judge Cynthia Erivo.

Series 20 (2022): with celebrity partner Matt Goss

 numbers indicate Matt & Nadiya were at the bottom of the leaderboard.

Strictly Come Dancing Christmas Special
She danced with Larry Lamb for the 2022 Strictly Come Dancing Christmas Special.

Personal life
In 2013, Bychkova married Russian dancer Sergey Konovaltsev; the marriage lasted two years. Bychkova was engaged to Slovenian footballer Matija Skarabot, with whom she has a daughter called Mila. 

In April 2015, Bychkova featured in the Ukrainian edition of Playboy magazine; she was also on the cover of FHM'' in March 2012.

In an appearance on Saturday Mash Up in January 2022, Bychkova was gunged, after receiving 63% of a viewer vote against Dan Walker and Kai Widdrington. Nadiya was ‘Super Slimed’ with 20 buckets of gunge. Also in January 2022, she announced that her and Matija were no longer a couple and have been living apart for a while. In June 2022 she confirmed she is in a relationship with Strictly co-star Kai Widdrington.

Dance tours 
In November 2022, Bychkova and Kai Widdrington announced they were to appear at "Dancing With The Stars Weekends" 2023.

References

Living people
Slovenian female dancers
21st-century dancers
1989 births
Ukrainian female dancers
People from Luhansk
Playboy people